Information protection policy is a document which provides guidelines to users on the processing, storage and transmission of sensitive information. Main goal is to ensure information is appropriately protected from modification or disclosure. It may be appropriate to have new employees sign policy as part of their initial orientation. It should define sensitivity levels of information.

Content
 Should define who can have access to sensitive information.
 Should define how sensitive information is to be stored and transmitted (encrypted, archive files, unencoded, etc.).
 Should define on which systems sensitive information can be stored.
 Should discuss what levels of sensitive information can be printed on physically insecure printers.
 Should define how sensitive information is removed from systems and storage devices.
 Should discuss any default file and directory permissions defined in system-wide configuration files.

See also
Network security
Network security policy
Computer security
Computer security policy
Information security
Information security policies
User account policy
Remote access policy
Internet security
Industrial espionage
FTC Fair Information Practices

External links
National Institute for Standards and Technology

Information technology management